Shabbir Boxwala is a senior producer in the Indian film industry since 1989 .He produced films Dil Ka Rishta, Ishq Forever, Mission Istanbul and many more. He is also the writer of Tridev, Mohra, Gupt: The Hidden Truth & many more.

Filmography

References

External links 

1956 births
Living people
Film producers from Mumbai
Indian film distributors
Indian television producers
Filmfare Awards winners
Tamil film producers
20th-century Indian businesspeople
21st-century Indian businesspeople